Guenoa or Güenoa were one of the native nations of Entre Rios, Argentina, Uruguay and some parts of Brazil. They were related to the other tribes in the area like Charrua, Minuane, Yaro and Bohán.

See also
Guenoa language

References

External links
  

Indigenous peoples in Uruguay
History of Uruguay
Indigenous peoples of the Southern Cone